Laoda is a  village in the Daspur I CD block in the Ghatal subdivision of the Paschim Medinipur district in the state of West Bengal, India.

Geography

Location

Area overview
Ishwar Chandra Vidyasagar, scholar, social reformer and a key figure of the Bengal Renaissance, was born at Birsingha on 26 September 1820.

Ghatal subdivision, shown in the map alongside, has alluvial soils. Around 85% of the total cultivated area is cropped more than once. It  has a density of population of 1,099 per km2, but being a small subdivision only a little over a fifth of the people in the district reside in this subdivision. 14.33% of the population lives in urban areas and 86.67% lives in the rural areas.

Note: The map alongside presents some of the notable locations in the subdivision. All places marked in the map are linked in the larger full screen map.

Demographics
According to the 2011 Census of India, Laoda had a total population of 1,328, of which 650 (49%) were males and 678 (50%) were females. There were 166 persons in the age range of 0–6 years. The total number of literate persons in Laoda was 872 (75.04% of the population over 6 years).

Culture
David J. McCutchion mentions the Banka Rai temple as a nava-ratna with smooth rekha turrets, measuring 18’ 4” square, built in 1801, having rich terracotta facade.

Laoda picture gallery

References

External links

Villages in Paschim Medinipur district